Songs of Minutes is a 2001 album by jazz band Erik Vermeulen trio.  It was recorded at the Studio Igloo (in Brussels) on April 17, 18 and 19.  The album contains both original compositions and covers (from Thelonious Monk, Harold Arlen, Charlie Haden, Duke Ellington and Billy Strayhorn).  It is the second release with Erik Vermeulen as a leader after Erik Vermeulen Icarus Consort's Into Pieces in 1997.

Track listing
"Evidence" (T. Monk) – 2:59
"Long Time" (E. Vermeulen) – 4:39
"Monk's Dream" (T. Monk) – 4:39
"Come Rain Or Come Shine" (H. Arlen) – 7:40
"Three Minutes And A Half" (S. La Rocca) – 3:44
"Before Silence" (E. Vermeulen) – 3:31
"Silence" (C. Haden) – 4:11
"Misterioso" (T. Monk) – 5:22
"The Star Crossed Lovers" (D. Ellington, B. Strayhorn) – 3:13
"Bemscha Swing" (T. Monk) – 5:25

Personnel
 Erik Vermeulen - piano
 Salvatore La Rocca - double bass
 Jan De Haas - drums, percussion

External links
 Jazz in Belgium website
 

Erik Vermeulen albums
2001 albums